Gisela L M Russ was a  cargo ship that was built in 1922 by Stettiner Oderwerke AG, Stettin, Germany for German owners. She was seized by the Allies in May 1945, passed to the Ministry of War Transport (MoWT) and was renamed Empire Consort. In 1946, she was sold to the Greek Government and renamed Volos and then sold and renamed Marios II in 1948. She served until she sank in 1959 following a boiler explosion.

Description
The ship was built in 1922 by Stettiner Oderwerke AG, Stettin.

The ship had a GRT of 1,771 and a NRT of 785. She had a DWT of 2,105.

The engine was built by Stettiner Oderwerke.

History
Gisela L M Russ was built for Ernst Russ, Hamburg. Her port of registry was Hamburg and the Code Letters RDHJ were allocated. Little is known of her merchant career, although it is recorded that she delivered 360 tonnes of mixed freight to Barcelona, Spain in March 1929. In 1934, her Code Letters were changed to DHJB.

Gisela L M Russ was seized by the Allies in May 1945 at Flensburg. Ownership passed to the MoWT and she was renamed Empire Consistence. She was delivered to the United Kingdom on 23 June 1945. Her port of registry was changed to London. The Code Letters GFVC and United Kingdom Official Number 180605 were allocated. She was placed under the management of the Springwell Steamship Co Ltd. In 1946, Empire Consort was sold to the Greek Government. She was renamed Volos. In 1948, she was sold to M A Karageorgis and renamed Marios II. On 19 February 1959, she suffered a boiler explosion whilst on a voyage from Stratoni to Piraeus.

References

1922 ships
Ships built in Stettin
Steamships of Germany
Merchant ships of Germany
World War II merchant ships of Germany
Ministry of War Transport ships
Empire ships
Steamships of the United Kingdom
Merchant ships of the United Kingdom
Steamships of Greece
Merchant ships of Greece
Maritime incidents in 1959
Shipwrecks in the Mediterranean Sea